Coronarctus is a genus of tardigrades in the family Coronarctidae. It was named and described by Renaud-Mornant in 1974.

Species
The genus includes seven species:
 Coronarctus disparilis Renaud-Mornant, 1987
 Coronarctus fastigatus Renaud-Mornant, 1987
 Coronarctus laubieri Renaud-Mornant, 1987
 Coronarctus mexicus Romano III, Gallo, D'Addabbo, Accogli, Baguley & Montagna, 2011 - Mexican crown bear
 Coronarctus stylisetus Renaud-Mornant, 1987
 Coronarctus tenellus Renaud-Mornant, 1974
 Coronarctus verrucatus Hansen, 2007

References

Further reading
 Renaud-Mornant, (1974), Une nouvelle famille de Tardigrades marins abyssaux: les Coronarctidae fam. nov. (Heterotardigrada). Comptes rendus hebdomadaires des séances de l'Académie des sciences. Series D, Natural Sciences, vol. 278, no 24, p. 3087-3090.

Coronarctidae
Tardigrade genera